St. Vincent's won the Championship for the second year in a row beating St. Oliver Plunkett's Eoghan Ruadh in the final on 27 October 2014 at a packed Parnell Park. The 2014 Dublin Senior Football Championship was the top club championship competition on the Dublin GAA calendar for 2014. The championship was changed since 2012, with a backdoor system no longer in place, meaning that the championship was played on a knockout basis. All teams knocked out in the first round of the Dublin championship are entered into the Dublin Senior B Championship. St. Maur's were eventual B Championship winners.

Round 1

Round 2
St. Sylvester's, Fingal Ravens, Ballinteer St. John's, Ballyboden St. Enda's, St. Oliver Plunkett's Eoghan Ruadh, Raheny, Skerries Harps, Lucan Sarsfields, Templeogue Synge Street, St. Vincent's, Ballymun Kickhams and Whitehall Colmcille qualified for the second round of the Dublin football Championship.

Quarter finals
The quarter final draw was announced on 20 September 2014 at Parnell Park.

Semi finals

Final
St. Vincents retain the Dublin Championship and go on to the Leinster Senior Club Football Championship.

References

External links
Dublin GAA Fixtures & Results
Live Updates and Scores

Dublin Senior Football Championship
Dublin Senior Football Championship